Rätsep is an Estonian surname meaning tailor. As of 1 January 2020, 806 people had the surname Rätsep in Estonia: 385 men and 421 women. Rätsep is ranked as the 105th most common surname form men, and the 104th most common surname for women in Estonia. It is most commonly found in Hiiu County. People bearing the surname Rätsep include:

Huno Rätsep (born 1927), linguist
Jüri Rätsep (1935–2018), lawyer, politician, and judge
Tõnis Rätsep (born 1947), actor, musician, educator, poet, and playwright
Väino Rätsep (born 1928), oncologist

References

Estonian-language surnames